Chlorodiloma odontis, common name the checkered top shell, is a species of sea snail, a marine gastropod mollusk in the family Trochidae, the top snails.

Description
The size of the shell varies between 10 mm and 20 mm. The globose-conic shell is more or less depressed. It is imperforate or very narrowly perforate. The sculpture is spirally finely striate, the striae becoming obsolete on the body whorl. The sharp incremental striae are microscopic. The apical whorls are white and eroded. The remainder is covered with a regular, elegant, minute reticulation formed by the intersection at right angles of two sets of obliquely descending black or bluish lines. The  body whorl is subangulate at the periphery. The thin outer lip is acute, inside green, and  beautifully iridescent. The arcuate columella is not dentate and is pearly edged. The umbilico-columellar area is vivid pea-green.

Distribution
This marine species is endemic to Australia and occurs off South Australia, Tasmania and Victoria

References

 Wood, W. 1828. Index Testaceologicus; or A Catalogue of Shells, British and Foreign, arranged according to the Linnean system. London : Taylor Supplement, 1-59, pls 1-8.
 Adams, H. & Adams, A. 1854. The genera of Recent Mollusca arranged according to their organization. London : John Van Voorst Vol. 1 pp. 257–484
 Paetel, F. 1873. Catalog der Conchylien-Sammlung von Fr. Paetel. Nebst uebersicht des angewandten Systems. Berlin : Gebrüder Paetel pp. [i] + 1-172
 Tenison-Woods, J.E. 1879. Census; with brief descriptions of the marine shells of Tasmania and the adjacent islands. Proceedings of the Royal Society of Tasmania 1877: 26-57
 Tenison-Woods, J.E. 1881. On some new marine Mollusca. Transactions and Proceedings of the Royal Society of Victoria 17: 80-83 
 Pritchard, G.B. & Gatliff, J.H. 1902. Catalogue of the marine shells of Victoria. Part V. Proceedings of the Royal Society of Victoria 14(2): 85-138 
 Cotton, B.C. & Godfrey, F.K. 1934. South Australian Shells. Part 13. South Australian Naturalist 1 16: 1-6
 Cotton, B.C. 1959. South Australian Mollusca. Archaeogastropoda. Handbook of the Flora and Fauna of South Australia. Adelaide : South Australian Government Printer 449 pp
 Macpherson, J.H. & Gabriel, C.J. 1962. Marine Molluscs of Victoria. Melbourne : Melbourne University Press & National Museum of Victoria 475 pp
 Phillips, D.A.B., Handreck, C., Bock, P.E., Burn, R., Smith, B.J. & Staples, D.A. (eds) 1984. Coastal Invertebrates of Victoria: an atlas of selected species. Melbourne : Marine Research Group of Victoria & Museum of Victoria 168 pp
 Wilson, B. 1993. Australian Marine Shells. Prosobranch Gastropods. Kallaroo, Western Australia : Odyssey Publishing Vol. 1 408 pp.

External links
 To Encyclopedia of Life
 To GenBank (2 nucleotides; 0 proteins)
 To World Register of Marine Species

odontis
Gastropods of Australia
Gastropods described in 1828